A dye is a colored substance that has an affinity to the substrate to which it is being applied.

Dye or Dyes may also refer to:
 Dye (surname), a surname
 Dye (EP), an EP by Got7
 DyE, French musician
 Dye, Missouri, an unincorporated community, United States
 Dyes Fork, a stream in Ohio, United States
 DYE Precision, a manufacturer of paintball equipment

People with the given name
 Joan Dye Gussow (born 1928), American food writer

See also
 Die (disambiguation)
 Dy (disambiguation)
 Russo–Dye